Download Series Volume 4 is a live album by the rock band the Grateful Dead. It was released as a digital download on August 2, 2005 and is a three disc set featuring virtually all of the June 18, 1976 show from the Capitol Theatre in Passaic, New Jersey. "Tennessee Jed" was omitted because the master tape was plagued with technical problems that could not be fixed in mastering. As a supplement to this omission, the third disc contains highlights from concerts later in June 1976 in Philadelphia and Chicago.

June 1976 was the beginning on a near non-stop touring circuit by the Dead that would last until the band dissolved in 1995 after Jerry Garcia's death. Also, Mickey Hart had just recently returned as the second drummer to the band after a five-year hiatus. In the middle of June, the band played three nights at the Capitol Theatre.

New songs for 1976 included "The Music Never Stopped", "Crazy Fingers", "Samson and Delilah", and "The Wheel". The show also featured one of only five Grateful Dead performances of Garcia's song "Mission In The Rain".

Volume 4 was mastered in HDCD by Jeffrey Norman.

Critical reception

Stephen Thomas Erlewine wrote on AllMusic, "Nearly all of the Passaic show is here, running 20 tracks over the equivalent of two discs, while the excerpts from the Philadelphia show run nine tracks, all containing songs unplayed in Jersey. This includes a rather epic "Playing in the Band" – 23 minutes that lead into "Drums" and "The Wheel" before returning for a three-minute reprise of "Playing". Such bravura jams are largely absent on the low-energy Passaic show... [which] is generally a lazy stroll through a fairly familiar set list; pleasant, but not especially memorable."

Track listing
Disc one
First set:
"The Music Never Stopped" (John Barlow, Bob Weir) - 5:54
"Sugaree" (Robert Hunter, Jerry Garcia) - 11:02
"Mama Tried" (Merle Haggard) - 3:06
"Crazy Fingers" (Hunter, Garcia) - 13:07
"Big River" (Johnny Cash) - 6:22
"Brown-Eyed Women" (Hunter, Garcia) - 4:49
"Looks Like Rain" (Barlow, Weir) - 7:57
"Row Jimmy" (Hunter, Garcia) - 10:28
"Cassidy" (Barlow, Weir) - 4:45
"Mission In the Rain" (Hunter, Garcia) - 7:44
"Promised Land" (Chuck Berry) - 4:18
Disc two
Second set:
"Samson and Delilah" (trad., arr. Grateful Dead) - 6:44
"St. Stephen" > (Hunter, Garcia, Phil Lesh) - 4:39
"Not Fade Away" > (Buddy Holly, Norman Petty) - 11:16
"St. Stephen" > (Hunter, Garcia, Lesh) - 1:02
"Eyes of the World" > (Hunter, Garcia) - 12:31
"Drums" > (Mickey Hart, Bill Kreutzmann) - 2:16
"The Wheel" > (Hunter, Garcia) - 4:42
"Sugar Magnolia" (Hunter, Weir) - 11:42
Encore: 
"U.S. Blues" (Hunter, Garcia) - 5:50
Disc three
Bonus tracks:
 "Scarlet Begonias" (6/21/76 Tower Theatre, Philadelphia, PA) - 10:59
 "Lazy Lightnin' " > (6/21/76 Tower Theatre, Philadelphia, PA) - 2:48
 "Supplication" (6/21/76 Tower Theatre, Philadelphia, PA) - 5:18
 "Candyman" (6/21/76 Tower Theatre, Philadelphia, PA) - 7:03
 "Playing In the Band" > (6/22/76 Tower Theatre, Philadelphia, PA) - 23:25
 "Drums" > (6/22/76 Tower Theatre, Philadelphia, PA) - 2:30
 "The Wheel" > (6/22/76 Tower Theatre, Philadelphia, PA) - 4:59
 "Playing In the Band" (6/22/76 Tower Theatre, Philadelphia, PA) - 3:21
 "High Time" (6/28/76 Auditorium Theatre, Chicago, IL) - 9:27

Personnel
Grateful Dead
Jerry Garcia –  lead guitar, vocals
Donna Jean Godchaux –  vocals 
Keith Godchaux –  Piano 
Mickey Hart –  drums 
Bill Kreutzmann –  drums
Phil Lesh –  electric bass
Bob Weir –  rhythm guitar, vocals
Production
Betty Cantor-Jackson – recording
 Jeffrey Norman – mastering

See also
Dave's Picks Volume 28 - Features the full show from the night before on June 17, 1976 at the Capitol Theater.

References

04
2005 live albums